Marimuthu Bharathan (born 9 January 1961
) is a Dalit human rights defender from the south Indian state of Tamil Nadu. He was awarded the 2012 Human Rights Tulip by the Dutch government, but was refused a passport to leave India to receive the award in person, due to a pending murder charge that he strongly denies.

Social position
Dalits ("untouchables"), who fall outside the Hindu caste system, are widely regarded in India as of inferior social status, and find their human rights often denied. In total there are about 260 million Dalits, mostly living in India.

He has spoken to the Dutch press about his experiences as a Dalit. "I have experienced the pain of untouchability from my youth. As a student I was beaten up because I was wearing shoes when walking through a higher-caste neighbourhood. In 2009, enraged caste Hindus wanted to kill me".

Bharathan describes the Dalits of India as slaves, lacking land, money and rights, and seeing little benefit from the economic growth of India. "Only a very small number of educated dalits manage to find a position in modern Indian society", he has said.

Activities

Human Rights Education and Protection Council

Bharathan is director of the Human Rights Education and Protection Council (known locally as KALAM) in Tirunelveli, a city in Tamil Nadu.  This organisation, in existence for over thirty years, works for the welfare of Dalits and challenges caste discrimination and human rights violations. It provides training and legal support and supports self-help organisations of Dalits, including Dalit women. Its activities on behalf of children from the Dalit community in 51 villages of Tirunelveli district have been documented: it has improved school enrolment rates, ensured more children are immunised and their births registered, and has set up children’s groups and centres. It has also put an end to manual scavenging in a number of villages.

Other activities

Bharathan is a long-standing campaigner against caste discrimination in temples, schools, and even teahouses, having documented over 450 cases in Tirunelveli and Tuticorin districts. He has alleged that "The country has several laws to protect human rights, but they are not implemented in letter and spirit." He has worked for compensation and rehabilitation of Dalits who suffer human rights violations, and has organised campaigns against police corruption.

2009 murder charge

On 27 May 2009 Bharathan was arrested and taken to the Suthamalli police station. Although his name did not figure in initial reports of the case, he was subsequently charged with the murder on 11 January 2009 of three caste Hindus, K. Madhan of Suthamalli and S. Ayyappan and N. Ayyappan, becoming the 25th person accused in the case.  After a court hearing on 3 June he was released on bail on 27 June. A further hearing was scheduled for 25 August 2009 but as Bharathan was not able to attend, he filed a petition and the hearing was re-scheduled to a later date. 

In January 2013 Bharathan stated that he had never met the other 24 accused in the case, and that it had still not come for trial.

Denial of charges

Bharathan himself, and several human rights groups, have denied the charges and have speculated about the motivation for them. Bharathan said "I’m facing all these problems only because of being a Dalit activist..." 

Indian human rights organizations strongly deny the allegations, which one of them has described as "judicial harassment". It has been claimed that the accusation of murder was obtained under duress from one of a group of jailed Dalit suspects whom Bharathan had been supporting in a case in 2009.

2012 Human Rights Tulip award

In December 2012 Bharathan was pronounced winner of the annual Dutch Human Rights Tulip award. In his mail to Bharathan, Gerard Oonk, the director of the India Committee of The Netherlands, stated that the independent award jury in his country had recognised him as a "tireless champion of better living and working conditions for his country’s Dalits."

However, on 18 December the passport office in Madurai, on advice from the Palayamkottai  police station, refused to renew Bharathan’s passport, preventing him from travelling to The Netherlands for the award ceremony in The Hague on 9 January 2013. The police cited the triple murder case pending since 2009 as grounds to deny him a passport. The award, worth 100,000 euros, was handed over in absentia by the Dutch foreign minister Frans Timmermans, after a message from Bharathan was read out. He said that India, a signatory of Human Rights Defenders Protection Treaty, "should not have let him down" by preventing him from travelling, as his attendance "would have been a recognition for 200 million Dalits."

It was the second year in succession that the Tulip award was not given in person: the 2011 winner, Chinese activist Ni Yulan, had been unable to attend the ceremony, as she was in custody and awaiting trial in a case.

Asked what he would do with his prize, Bharathan said that he would like to set up a training centre "to help educate the Dalits to demand their legitimate rights by peaceful and legal methods".

Questions in Dutch Parliament

On 28 January 2013, the Minister of Foreign Affairs, Mr. Timmermans and the Minister of Foreign Trade and Development Co-operation, Lilianne Ploumen were asked in the Dutch House of Representatives what the Dutch government would do to support Bharathan in his struggle for human rights of Dalits; referring to "the criminal court case against him and 23 other Dalit accused because of a – according to human rights organisations – false accusation of murder and [the obstruction of] Bharathan’s work by the Tamil Nadu government."  The matter was again raised on 12 March, asking whether the Dutch government would raise with the Indian government "the problems that Bharathan is experiencing at the hands of the Indian government – including a ban to organise demonstrations or to participate in [them]", and if so, when and in what way.

The reply was, in part, that "The Netherlands respects the Indian legal system and therefore does not interfere in this ongoing case. The contact with Mr. Bharathan will be maintained also in view of the further development of the [Tulip] Award."

References

Indian human rights activists
Dalit activists
Activists from Tamil Nadu
Living people
1961 births